Golding Constable's Vegetable Garden is an 1815 painting by John Constable. The work shows the vegetable garden belonging to Constable's father, Golding Constable, who lived in the Suffolk village of East Bergholt.

It was intended for Constable's private collection. It formed a pair with the painting Golding Constable's Flower Garden and hangs with it in Christchurch Mansion in Ipswich.

References

1815 paintings
Paintings by John Constable
Paintings in the East of England